Misi Mókus kalandjai ​is a Hungarian stop motion animated series, an adaptation of  books by Józsi Jenő Tersánszky. The TV series was produced by The Pannonia Film Studio and broadcast on Magyar Televízió. In 1984, a film was produced based on the television series.

Plot Summary

The series follow the adventures of Sam the squirrel who hates studying.

Episode list

References

External links

1982 Hungarian television series debuts
1982 Hungarian television series endings
Stop-motion animated television series
Television shows based on children's books
Hungarian animated films
Hungarian-language television shows
Adventure television series